Dylan Cozens may refer to:

Dylan Cozens (baseball) (born 1994), American professional baseball outfielder
Dylan Cozens (ice hockey) (born 2001), Canadian professional ice hockey centre